Glenda Margaret Halliday  is an Australian neuroscientist. As of 2021, she is a professor at the University of Sydney and research fellow in the National Health and Medical Research Council (NHMRC). She was named 2022 NSW Scientist of the Year.

Education 
Halilday graduated with a BSc from the University of New South Wales (UNSW) in 1981. She went on to graduate with a PhD from the Faculty of Medicine at the UNSW in 1986, with a thesis titled "The organization of the ventromedial mesencephalic tegmentum". While undertaking her PhD she founded a donor program to enable study of Parkinson's disease in the brain.

Career 
Halliday is a research fellow of the NHMRC, first appointed to that role in 1990. Working at UNSW, she was appointed professor of medicine in 2003 and subsequently professor of neuroscience in 2008.  As of 2021 she is a professor and NHMRC leadership fellow based at the University of Sydney.

Halliday's research focuses on neurodegeneration, including Parkinson’s disease and frontotemporal dementia. Her work has led to improved treatment of Parkinson's sufferers.

Honours and recognition 
Halliday was elected a Fellow of the Australian Academy of Health and Medical Sciences in 2015 and Fellow of the Australian Academy of Science in May 2021. She was awarded the 2020 NHMRC Elizabeth Blackburn Investigator Grant Award for Leadership in Clinical Medicine and Science and in 2021 won the international Robert A. Pritzker Prize for Leadership in Parkinson's Research. She was named NSW Scientist of the Year at the 2022 NSW Premier's Prizes for Science and Engineering recognising her research on neurodegenerative diseases.

References

External links 
 

Living people
Year of birth missing (living people)
Fellows of the Australian Academy of Health and Medical Sciences
Fellows of the Australian Academy of Science
Academic staff of the University of Sydney
University of New South Wales alumni
Australian women neuroscientists